The World Russian People's Council is an international public organization and forum.

It is a place of meeting for people who are united under a shared objective – concern over the present and future of Russia.  In Council sessions, participants include governmental representatives, leaders of public associations, clergy members of the major religions in Russia, science and culture figures, and delegates of Russian communities from the near and far abroad.

The World Russian People's Council was founded in 1993.  It is headed by the Patriarch of Moscow and all Rus' Kirill.

Regional departments operate in many Russian cities, including Volgograd, Kaliningrad, Smolensk, and Sarov.

On 21 July 2005, the World Russian People's Council was given special consultative status within the United Nations.

During its 10th meeting, held on 4–6 April 2006 in Moscow's Cathedral of Christ the Saviour, it adopted The Russian Declaration of Human Rights.

References

Non-profit organizations based in Russia
Diaspora organizations
1993 establishments in Russia